Pinwherry is a hamlet in the civil parish of Colmonell, in the council area of South Ayrshire, Scotland. It is 8 miles south of Girvan. In 1961 it had a population of 100. The hamlet contains the 16th century Pinwherry Castle.

References 

Villages in South Ayrshire